My Family Care is an employee benefits company based in the United Kingdom

Founded by Ben Black, the company started as a web-based service Emergency Childcare - expanding to set up an Eldercare service, and offer other family benefits. Ben and Oliver Black’s chain of nanny agencies, Tinies Childcare, were used to support the parents registering for the service nationwide.

As Emergency Child and Home Care Ltd, the company offered web-based backup childcare and backup eldercare services, winning the Daily Telegraphs Trailblazers Award in 2007. Later in 2007 the company took over BUPA’s corporate childcare division, gaining their personal childcare search and helpline services, plus several key corporate clients.

Over 350,000 employees in the UK have access to My Family Care’s services. Their clients include government agencies, corporations and service firms, as well as the Met Police and the NHS.

 In 2008, My Family Care won Microsoft's People Moving Business Award for 'Most Innovative use of Mobile Technology'.
 In 2009, My Family Care was one of the BT Business Essence of the Entrepreneur Winners. As part of the competition, Ben Black had his photograph taken by Rankin.
 In 2010, My Family Care was one of the Smarta 100 winners. The Smarta 100 awards businesses in the UK.

Services available to UK companies include:

 Consultancy & Training
 Backup Care
 Care Search
 Life Transition Coaching
 Relocation Solutions
 On-Site Childcare

My Family Care also owns the parent matching website Nannyshare.co.uk.

In 2019 My Family Care was acquired by Bright Horizons

Notes and references

External links
 My Family Care website

Employee benefits
Child care companies
Companies based in the London Borough of Hammersmith and Fulham
Financial services companies established in 2005
Social care in England
British companies established in 2005